Gigantettix is a genus of camel crickets in the subfamily Aemodogryllinae and tribe Diestramimini.  The type species, from Vietnam, was originally assigned to the genus Diestramima (D. gigantea Gorochov); subsequently, other species have been found in the Indo-China region.

Species
The Orthoptera Species File lists:
 Gigantettix gigantea (Gorochov, 1992) – type species
 Gigantettix laosensis Gorochov & Storozhenko, 2015
 Gigantettix longipes (Rehn, 1906)
 Gigantettix maximus Gorochov, 1998
 Gigantettix minusculus Gorochov, 1998
 Gigantettix sapaensis Gorochov, 2002

Reference 

Rhaphidophoridae
Ensifera genera
Orthoptera of Indo-China